Doumuhu is a subdistrict of Dingcheng District in Changde Prefecture-level City, Hunan, China. The subdistrict was reformed through reorganization of the former Doumuhu Town in 2013.

External links
 Official Website (Chinese / 中文)

References

Dingcheng District
Subdistricts of Hunan